Jhargram Raj College, established in 1949, is one of the oldest government college in Jhargram, in the Jhargram district. It offers undergraduate courses in arts, commerce and science, and postgraduate courses in some arts and science subjects. It was previously affiliated to the University of Calcutta, and is currently affiliated to  Vidyasagar University.

Location
The college is situated in the small town of Jhargram, in the Jhargram district. It is well connected by road to Medinpur, the district headquarters. It can also be reached through rail routes. It is less than an hour's journey from Kharagpur by train.

History
Founded in 1949 by Narasingha Malla Deb as Jhargram Agricultural College, it grew into a centre of higher learning, offering to undergraduate students an array of subjects from three disciplines of arts, commerce and science. In its formative years, the college received lavish patronage from the Royal Family of Jhargram. In 1953, the Government of West Bengal took over the college. Originally affiliated to the University of Calcutta, the college was attached to the Vidyasagar University in 1985. On 8 May 1999 the college celebrated it 50th anniversary.

Departments

Science

Chemistry
Computer Science
Physics
Mathematics
Botany
Zoology
Physiology

Arts and Commerce

Bengali
English
Sanskrit
History
Political Science
Philosophy
Physical Education
Commerce

Accreditation
In 2007 Jhargram Raj College was awarded B++ grade by the National Assessment and Accreditation Council (NAAC). The college is also recognized by the University Grants Commission (UGC).

See also
List of institutions of higher education in West Bengal
Education in India
Education in West Bengal

References

External links
Jhargram Raj College 
Vidyasagar University
University Grants Commission
National Assessment and Accreditation Council

Colleges affiliated to Vidyasagar University
Educational institutions established in 1949
Universities and colleges in Jhargram district
1949 establishments in West Bengal